USS Lancaster (AK-193) was an  that was constructed by the US Navy during the closing period of World War II. She was declared excess-to-needs and returned to the US Maritime Commission shortly after commissioning.

Construction
The fourth ship to be so named by the Navy, Lancaster was laid down under a Maritime Commission contract, MC hull 2124, 1 July 1944, by Walter Butler Shipbuilding Inc., Superior, Wisconsin; launched the same year; acquired by the Navy 21 September 1945; and commissioned the same day.

Post-war decommissioning
The end of World War II reduced the need for cargo ships, and Lancaster decommissioned 23 November 19, she was returned to the War Shipping Administration the same day with her name reverting to Coastal Ringleader.

Merchant service
Coastal Ringleader was used by several shipping companies from 1945–1948, when she was placed in the reserve fleet.

On 13 July 1956, she was sold to Companhia Nacional de Navegacao Costerira, Patrimonio Nacional, of Brazil, for $693,682, under the condition that she be used for coastal shipping. She was delivered on 2 October 1956.

Notes 

Citations

Bibliography 

Online resources

External links

 

Alamosa-class cargo ships
Lancaster County, Pennsylvania
Ships built in Superior, Wisconsin
1944 ships
World War II auxiliary ships of the United States